Oligoryzomys vegetus, also known as the sprightly colilargo or sprightly pygmy rice rat, is a species of rodent in the genus Oligoryzomys of family Cricetidae. It is found only in the mountains of Costa Rica and western Panama.

References

Literature cited

Timm, R. and Woodman, N. 2008. . In IUCN. IUCN Red List of Threatened Species. Version 2009.2. <www.iucnredlist.org>. Downloaded on November 28, 2009.

Oligoryzomys
Mammals described in 1902
Taxonomy articles created by Polbot